The Harvard step test, in scientific literature sometimes referred to as the Brouha Test, is a type of cardiac stress test for detecting and diagnosing cardiovascular disease.  It is also a good measurement of fitness and a person's ability to recover after a strenuous exercise by checking the recovery rate. The test was developed by Lucien Brouha and his associates in 1942.

Procedure
The test subject repeatedly steps onto and off of a platform in a cycle of two seconds. The rate of 30 steps per minute must be sustained for five minutes or until exhaustion. To ensure the right speed, a metronome is used. Exhaustion is the point at which the subject cannot maintain the stepping rate for 15 seconds. The subject immediately sits down on completion of the test, and the heartbeats are counted for 1 to 1.5, 2 to 2.5, and 3 to 3.5 minutes.

The results are written down as time until exhaustion in seconds and total heartbeats counted. It is plotted into a simple fitness index equation:

The outcome of the equation is rated as follows:

Modified versions
The test was developed at Harvard University in 1942. Several modified versions of the original Harvard step test exist; examples include the Tecumseh step test and the Kasch step test. Another modified version, the Sharkey step test, was developed in the 1970s for use by the United States Forest Service at the University of Montana in Missoula.

See also
 Multi-stage fitness
 Cardiology
 Cardiology diagnostic tests and procedures
 Electrocardiogram
 Physical fitness
 Work Capacity Test

Footnotes

References

External links

Fitness tests
Medical tests